Ptenothrix maculosa is a species of globular springtails in the family Dicyrtomidae.

References

Further reading

 
 
 

Collembola
Animals described in 1891